Medalla Milagrosa is a station on Line E of the Buenos Aires Underground. It is located at the intersection of Eva Perón and Pumacahua avenues. The station was opened on 31 October 1985 as the western terminus of the one-line extension from Emilio Mitre. On 27 November 1985, the line was expended to Varela. Medalla Milagrosa is near the small Koreatown of Buenos Aires.

References

External links

Buenos Aires Underground stations
Railway stations opened in 1985
1985 establishments in Argentina